Scinax oreites is a species of frog in the family Hylidae.
It is endemic to Peru.
Its natural habitats are subtropical or tropical moist montane forests, swamps, intermittent freshwater lakes, and freshwater marshes.
It is threatened by habitat loss.

References

oreites
Amphibians of Peru
Amphibians described in 1993
Taxonomy articles created by Polbot